CORC (the Cornell computing language) was a simple computer language developed at Cornell University in 1962 to serve lay users, namely for students to use to solve math problems. Its developers, industrial engineering professors Richard W. Conway and William L. Maxwell, sought to create a language which could both expose mathematics and engineering students to computing and remove the burden of mechanical problem-solving from their professors.

CORC was designed with ease of use in mind. It contained strains of both FORTRAN and ALGOL but was much simpler. Since programs were tediously input with punched cards, the compiler had a high tolerance for error, attempting to bypass or even correct problem sections of code. Students could submit a program by 5 PM which would be compiled or run overnight, with results available the next morning.

It was initially run on the Burroughs 220 and later extended to the CDC 1604.  In 1966 it was superseded by CUPL, a batch compiler for teaching which ran on the IBM System/360.

An extension of CORC, the Cornell List Processor (CLP), was a list processing language used for simulation.

References

 David N. Freeman. 1964. "Error correction in CORC: the Cornell Computing Language". In Proceedings of the October 27-29, 1964, fall joint computer conference, part I (AFIPS '64 (Fall, part I)). Association for Computing Machinery, 15–34. https://doi.org/10.1145/1464052.1464055
 Richard C. Lesser's Recollections: The Cornell Computing Center - the early years, 1953 to 1964.

External links
Resource page for cupl 1.6, providing binary and source code and background information about CUPL and CORC.

Procedural programming languages
Cornell University
Programming languages created in 1962